The Bayer designation Gamma Caeli (γ Cae, γ Caeli) is shared by two star systems, in the constellation Caelum:
 γ1 Caeli
 γ2 Caeli
They are separated by 0.22° on the sky.

Caeli, Gamma
Caelum